Fort Reynolds was a United States Army post near Avondale, Colorado during the Indian Wars and the Civil War.

Construction began in 1867 on the 23 square mile fort, which was named for John F. Reynolds. He attended West Point and was killed at the Battle of Gettysburg. Facilities included barracks, a mess hall, hospital, guardhouse, store-house, laundry, a corral, supply depot, and parade grounds. In January 1868, soldiers were called from Fort Lyon and Fort Reynolds to manage citizen unrest in Trinidad, Colorado that began with a drunken brawl. That was the extent of the action seen by the Fort Reynolds post. It closed in 1872.

In the 1930s, the site had remnants of camp life, including cooking utensils, weapons, buttons, and other items. A stone marker is located on US-50 at mile marker 333, about one mile east of Avondale.

References

External links
 Fort Reynolds stone marker, and inscription

American Civil War army posts
Forts in Colorado
Military history of Colorado
Government buildings completed in 1867
Colorado in the American Civil War
Native American history of Colorado
Closed installations of the United States Army
1867 establishments in Colorado Territory